A. innotata may refer to:
 Acronicta innotata, the unmarked dagger moth or birch dagger, a moth species found Northern America
 Aythya innotata, the Madagascar pochard, an extremely rare diving duck species

See also
 Innotata